Buôn Hồ is a town (thị xã) of Đắk Lắk province in the Central Highlands of Vietnam. Until December 2008, the town was the southern portion of Krông Búk District.

Buôn Hồ is subdivided into seven wards (phường) and five communes (xã):
Wards: Đạt Hiếu, An Lạc, An Bình, Thiện An, Đoàn Kết, Thống Nhất, Bình Tân
Communes: Ea Siên, Ea Drông, Ea Blang, Bình Thuận, Cư Bao

As of December 2008, Buôn Hồ had a population of 101,554. The district covers an area of 282.06 km2.

References
  Government Decree No. 07/NĐ-CP enacted on 23 December 2008 by the Government of Vietnam.

Districts of Đắk Lắk province
County-level towns in Vietnam